A swagger or swagga is a swaggering gait.

Swagger also may refer to:
 Swagger or swagman, a transient labourer in Australia and New Zealand
 Swagger (software), a specification for defining the interface of a REST web service
 Swagger Creek, a river in the United States
 Swagger stick, a riding crop carried by a uniformed person as a symbol of authority
 Bob Lee Swagger, fictional character created by Stephen Hunter
 Jack Swagger (born 1982), American professional wrestler
 Swagger (TV series), an American  drama television series

Musical works 
 Swagger (No-Man EP) (1989), EP by No Man Is an Island
 Swagger (Gun album) (1994), by Gun
 Swagger (Flogging Molly album) (2000)
 "Swagga Like Us" (2008), a song by four hip-hop performers
 Swagger (Lucie Idlout album) (2009)
  "Swagger Jagger" (2011) song by Cher Lloyd

See also 
 Swag (disambiguation)
 Radio station "WRZE Swagga 94.1 & 105.9"